Silverwoods, originally promoted as F. B. Silverwood, after its founder, was a men's clothing store chain founded in Los Angeles in 1894 by Francis Bernard (F.B. "Daddy") Silverwood, a Canadian-American originally from near Lindsay, Ontario. He was a colorful character covered in the newspapers, a "songster" composer of popular songs, Shriner, and who famously married in 1920. 

The first F. B. Silverwood store opened on May 8, 1894 at 124 S. Spring St., carried only men's furnishings, had four employees and had sales of $38,000 that year. Silverwood then moved to a larger location at 221 S. Spring St. The flagship store was established in 1904 at Sixth & Broadway. In 1920 the store removed to temporary quarters at 320 S. Broadway while the old store was demolished starting January 26, 1920. A new  six-floor store was built on the site of the old one at 6th and Broadway. The new store opened September 1, 1920.

Upon opening in 1920 the flagship had the following departments:
1st floor, hats and furnishings
2nd floor, suits and overcoats
3rd floor, boys' clothing
4th floor, storeroom
5th floor, general offices and alterations
Basement, outing and work clothes; gloves

The company incorporated in November 1920. At that time there were four branches (Long Beach, Bakersfield, Maricopa and San Bernardino) plus the flagship. F. B. Silverwood died in March 1924. In later decades the store was purchased by Hartmarx and focused on business suits until the end, later becoming out of sync with clothing preferences of Southern California men.

By 1992 when the chain closed, Silverwoods had grown to an eighteen store chain with branches across Greater Los Angeles.

Stores
In 1973, Silverwoods branches were located at:

References

Defunct department stores based in Greater Los Angeles
Defunct clothing retailers of the United States